Zoran Vasković (Serbian Cyrillic: Зоран Васковић; born 14 February 1979) is a Serbian former professional footballer who played as a goalkeeper. He spent the majority of his career at his hometown club Radnički Niš. In 2000, Vasković earned two caps for FR Yugoslavia at under-21 level.

References

External links
 
 

Association football goalkeepers
Belgian Pro League players
Expatriate footballers in Belgium
Expatriate footballers in North Macedonia
First League of Serbia and Montenegro players
FK Jagodina players
FK Napredak Kruševac players
FK Pobeda players
FK Radnički Niš players
FK Vlasina players
K.F.C. Lommel S.K. players
Serbia and Montenegro expatriate footballers
Serbia and Montenegro expatriate sportspeople in Belgium
Serbia and Montenegro footballers
Serbia and Montenegro under-21 international footballers
Serbian expatriate footballers
Serbian expatriate sportspeople in North Macedonia
Serbian First League players
Serbian footballers
Serbian SuperLiga players
Sportspeople from Niš
1979 births
Living people